Karl Ulrich Smith (born 1 May 1907 in Zanesville, Ohio, d. 22 June 1994 in Lake Wales, Florida) was an American physiologist, psychologist and behavioral cybernetician.

He dealt among others with the interaction between humans and technology and played a crucial role in the development of human factors which deals with the safe and humane or healthy design of products, work equipment and work systems.

Works 
Books

Articles
 Smith, K. U. (1972) Social tracking in the development of educational skills, American Journal of Optometry and Physiological Optics (1972) 49: 50-60
 Smith, T. J., Henning, R. A. and Smith, K. U.: Sources of performance variability. In: Salvendy, G. and Karwowski, W.: Design of work and development of personnel in advanced manufacturing New York: Wiley (1994) pp. 273–354
 Smith, T. J., Henning, R. A. and Smith, K. U.: Performance of hybrid automated systems - a social cybernetic analysis In: International Journal of Human Factors in Manufacturing. New York: Wiley (1995)  5(1): 29–51
 Smith, K.U.: Physiological and Sensory Feedback of the Motor System: Neural-Metabolic Integration for Energy Regulation in Behavior. In: Maser, J. D.: Efferent organization and the integration of behavior. New York: Academic Press (1973) pp. 20–66
 Smith, K.U. und Putz, V.: Feedback factors in steering and tracking behavior.  In: Journal of Applied Psychology. (1970) 54(2): 176-183
 Smith, K.U. und Putz, V.: Feedback analysis of learning and performance in steering and tracking behavior . In: Journal of Applied Psychology. (1970) 54(3): 239-247
 Henry, J. P., Junas, R. and Smith, K. U.: Experimental cybernetic analysis of delayed feedback of breath-pressure control. In: American Journal of Physical Medicine. (1967) 46(4): 1317-1331
 Smith, K.U.: Cybernetic Psychology. In: Singer, R. N. (Ed.): The Psychomotor Domain: Movement Behavior. Philadelphia: Lea & Febiger, 1972.pp. 285–348
 Smith, T. J., and Smith, K. U.: Cybernetic factors in motor performance and development. In: Goodman, D.; Wilberg, R.B. and Franks, I.M. (Eds.): Differing Perspectives in Motor Learning, Memory, and Control. Amsterdam: Elsevier. Advances in Psychology 1985 27:239-283
 Smith, K. U. and Henry, J.: Cybernetic foundations of rehabilitative science. American Journal of Physical Medicine (1967) 46(1):379-467
 Smith, K. U. and Smith, T. J. (1970) Feedback mechanisms of athletic skill and learning. In L. Smith, Ed., Motor skill and learning (pp. 83–195). Chicago: Athletic Institute.
 Smith, K.U.: Physiological and Sensory Feedback of the Motor System: Neural-Metabolic Integration for Energy Regulation in Behavior. In: Maser, J. D.: Efferent organization and the integration of behavior. New York: Academic Press (1973) pp. 20–66
 Sauter, S. L.: A Cybernetic analysis of the behavioral-respiratory modulation of heart rate and heart-rate variability. PhD. Dissertation. Wisconsin:  University of Wisconsin-Madison (1975)
 Smith, T. J. and Smith, K. U.: Feedback-control mechanisms of human behavior. In: Salvendy, G. (Ed.). Handbook of Human Factors. New York: Wiley (1987) pp. 251–293.
 Smith, T.J., and Smith, K.U.: Behavioral cybernetic basis of cognitive performance. Experimental and theoretical analysis. In: Ergonomics (Special Issue on Methodological Issues in Cognitive Ergonomics). 1988.
 Gould, J. and Smith, K. U.: Angular displacement of visual feedback in motion and learning. In: Perceptual and Motor Skills (1963) 17:699-710

References

External links 
 Karwowski, Waldemar: International Encyclopedia of Ergonomics and Human Factors
 KU Smith - Pubmed-search-results

1907 births
American physiologists
20th-century American psychologists
1994 deaths